Chris L. Rucker (born October 12, 1988) is an American football defensive back who is currently a free agent. He was drafted by the Indianapolis Colts in the sixth round of the 2011 NFL Draft. He played college football at Michigan State.

Professional career

Indianapolis Colts
Rucker was drafted by the Indianapolis Colts with the 188th pick in the 2011 NFL Draft. He was waived by the Colts on August 26, 2012.

Ottawa Redblacks
Rucker was signed to the Ottawa Redblacks' practice squad in August 2014. He was released by the Redblacks on October 14, 2014.

References

External links
Indianapolis Colts bio
Michigan State Spartans bio
Just Sports Stats
Ottawa Redblacks profile

1988 births
Living people
Sportspeople from Warren, Ohio
Players of American football from Ohio
African-American players of American football
American football cornerbacks
Michigan State Spartans football players
Indianapolis Colts players
Nashville Venom players
African-American players of Canadian football
Canadian football defensive backs
Ottawa Redblacks players
21st-century African-American sportspeople
20th-century African-American people